Clement Fisher (c. 1539 – 23 October 1619), of Great Packington, Warwickshire, was an English Member of Parliament.

In 1584, he represented Tamworth.

References

1530s births
1619 deaths
English MPs 1584–1585
People from Warwickshire